Victor Kuzmich Teterin (October 25, 1922 in Bakharevo, Tver Province, Soviet Russia – October 1, 1991 in Leningrad, USSR) was a Russian painter, watercolorist, and art teacher, who lived and worked in Leningrad is regarded as one of the important representatives of the Leningrad school of painting.

Biography 
Teterin was born October 25, 1922, in Bakharevo village, Tver Province. Since 1930, together with his parents, he lived in Leningrad. His father worked in ship repair shops, a mother was a dressmaker, she engaged in the upbringing of children and housekeeping.

In 1937–1940 Teterin was engaged in the famous art studio at the Leningrad Palace of Pioneers, where he studied with the famous artist and teacher, a disciple of Repin Alfred Eberling. In 1940 he entered at the Leningrad Secondary Art School under All-Russian Academy of Arts, where he studied of Pavel Naumov, Mikhail Natarevich, and Olga Bogaevskaya. After the beginning of the Great Patriotic War he remained in Leningrad. In February 1942, together with the Secondary Art School and the Academy of Arts, he was evacuated from blockade Leningrad to Samarkand.

In 1944 Victor Teterin entered at the first course of Department of Painting at the Leningrad Institute of Painting, Sculpture and Architecture named after Ilya Repin, where he studied of Alexander Osmerkin, Semion Abugov, Genrikh Pavlovsky, and Gleb Savinov.

In 1949 he graduated from Ilya Repin Institute in Mikhail Avilov workshop, together with Rostislav Vovkushevsky, Ivan Godlevsky, Valery Pimenov, Maria Rudnitskaya, and other young artists. His graduation work was historical painting "Stalin at exile in Narym".

Since 1949 Teterin has participated in Art Exhibitions. He painted portraits, landscapes, genre compositions, worked in oils, tempera, and watercolors. In 1949—1956 he taught painting and drawings at the Leningrad Higher School of Industrial Art named after Vera Mukhina. Among his best known paintings of the 1950s there were "At the Kazan Cathedral" (1949), "Harvesting", "A Winter in Pavlovsk" (both 1950), "A Portrait of Wife in Yellow Dress", "Still Life", "Landscape in Gurzuf" (all 1953), "Portrait of a Mother behind a Sewing Machine", "Sredny Prospekt of the Vasilievsky Island", "Portrait of a Man" (all 1954), "Still Life" (1955), "Peaches and Pears" (1956), "In front of May", "Autumn Bouquet" (both 1957), "Quince and Grapes", "Apple Tree Branch", "A Working Lad" (all 1958), "In Sunny Day", "Road Builders" (both 1959), and others.

In according to art critics, the peak of Teterin's creative work falls on the 1960–1970. Among his well-known paintings of this period were "My Parents", "Quince and Teapot", "The End of the Summer", "Southern Still Life", "Olive Grove", "House with Balconies" (all 1966), "Still Life with Rose", "A Spring. View of the Smolenka River" (both 1968), "Olives", "Sredne Podyacheskaya Street" (both 1969), "Red Poppies", "Pears and Pomegranates" (both 1975), "Still life with a Dog Rose" (1977), "Blue Balcony", "Callas" (both 1978), "A Girl in a Lilac Dress", "A Girl on the windowsill", "Peonies" (all 1979), and others.

Among his last paintings were "Naked" (1981), "Toilet" (1982), "Apples, a Bottle and a Basket" (1983), "Still life with a Spanish Jug" (1985), "Sea shore in Gurzuf", "Table Tennis" (both 1985), and others.

His solo exhibitions were in Leningrad in 1966, 1988, and in Saint Petersburg in 1999. In 1960–1970 Teterin become one of leader of the "left wing" of the Leningrad Union of Artists, which member he was since 1953. In 1972 together with his wife Evgenia Antipova he take part in the famous Exhibition of the eleven artists.

Victor Kuzmich Teterin died in Leningrad in 1991. His paintings reside in State Russian Museum, State Tretyakov Gallery, in Art museums and private collections in Russia, France, Germany, in the US, England, Japan, and other countries.

See also
 Quince and Teapot (painting)
 Fine Art of Leningrad
 Leningrad School of Painting
 List of Russian artists
 List of 20th-century Russian painters
 List of painters of Saint Petersburg Union of Artists
 List of the Russian Landscape painters
 Saint Petersburg Union of Artists

References

Sources
Центральный Государственный Архив литературы и искусства. СПб. Ф.78. Оп.8. Д.457.
Львов Е. Таланты одной школы // Смена, 1940, 28 февраля.
Выставка произведений ленинградских художников 1951 года. Каталог. М-Л., Искусство, 1951. С.48.
Весенняя выставка произведений ленинградских художников 1953 года. Каталог. Л., ЛССХ, 1953. С.8.
Весенняя выставка произведений ленинградских художников 1953 года. Каталог. Л., Ленинградский Союз советских художников, 1953. С.8.
Весенняя выставка произведений ленинградских художников 1954 года. Каталог. Л., Изогиз, 1954. С.19.
Осенняя выставка произведений ленинградских художников. 1956 года. Каталог. Л., Ленинградский художник, 1958. С.23.
Выставка живописи, скульптуры, графики к Первому Всесоюзному съезду советских художников. Каталог. М., Оргкомитет Союза советских художников, 1957.
1917 — 1957. Выставка произведений ленинградских художников. Каталог. Л., Ленинградский художник, 1958. С.31.
Передвижная выставка произведений ленинградских художников. Каталог. Мурманск, ЛССХ, 1957.
Всесоюзная художественная выставка, посвященная 40-летию Великой Октябрьской социалистической революции. Каталог. М., Советский художник, 1957. С.78.
Выставка произведений ленинградских художников 1960 года. Каталог. Л., Художник РСФСР, 1963. С.18.
Выставка произведений ленинградских художников 1960 года. Каталог. Л., Художник РСФСР, 1961. С.41.
Выставка произведений ленинградских художников 1961 года. Каталог. Л., Художник РСФСР, 1964. С.39.
Осенняя выставка произведений ленинградских художников 1962 года. Каталог. Л., Художник РСФСР, 1962. С.26.
Ленинград. Зональная выставка. Л., Художник РСФСР, 1965. С.54-55.
Молдавский Д. «Ленинград». На зональных художественных выставках // Литературная Россия, 1964, 27 ноября.
Никифоровская И. У художников весна // Ленинградская правда, 1965, 19 июня.
Третья республиканская художественная выставка «Советская Россия». Каталог. М., Министерство культуры РСФСР, 1967. С.56.
Каталог произведений художников Российской Федерации, переданных в дар организациям и учреждениям культуры (1963—1971 гг.). М., СХ РСФСР, 1972. С.111.
По родной стране. Выставка произведений художников Ленинграда. 50 Летию образования СССР посвящается. Каталог. Л., Художник РСФСР, 1974. С.25.
Арбузов Г. С мыслью о родине // Ленинградская правда, 1972, 10 октября.
Каталог выставки одиннадцати ленинградских художников. Л., Художник РСФСР, 1976.
Наш современник. Зональная выставка произведений ленинградских художников 1975 года. Каталог. Л., Художник РСФСР, 1980. С.25.
Изобразительное искусство Ленинграда. Каталог выставки. Л., Художник РСФСР, 1976. С.32.
Выставка произведений ленинградских художников, посвященная 60-летию Великого Октября. Л., Художник РСФСР, 1982. С.22.
Справочник членов Союза художников СССР. Т.2. М., Советский художник, 1979. С.424.
Зональная выставка произведений ленинградских художников 1980 года. Каталог. Л., Художник РСФСР, 1983. С.24.
Выставки советского изобразительного искусства. Справочник. Т.5. 1954—1958 гг. М., Советский художник, 1981. С.26, 28, 122, 260, 342, 378, 387, 421.
Мочалов Л. Виктор Тетерин. Л., Художник РСФСР, 1982.
Мы побратимы — сохраним мир. Третья совместная выставка произведений художников Ленинграда и Дрездена. Дрезден, 1986. С.207.
Directory of members of the Leningrad branch of Union of Artists of Russian Federation. Leningrad., Khudozhnik RSFSR, 1987. P.130.
Виктор Кузьмич Тетерин. Выставка произведений. Каталог. Л., Художник РСФСР, 1988.
Выставка произведений 26 ленинградских и московских художников. Каталог. Л., Художник РСФСР, 1990. С.36-37, 51–52.
Лирика в произведениях художников военного поколения. Выставка произведений. Каталог. СПб., 1995. С.6.
Памяти учителя. Выставка петербургских художников — учеников мастерской А. А. Осмеркина. СПб., 1997. С.4,5.
Связь времен. 1932—1997. Художники — члены Санкт—Петербургского Союза художников России. Каталог выставки. СПб., 1997. С.299.
Matthew C. Bown. Dictionary of 20th Century Russian and Soviet Painters 1900-1980s. - London: Izomar, 1998. , .
Евгения Антипова, Виктор Тетерин. Живопись. Рисунок. СПб., 1999. 
Художники круга 11-ти. Из коллекции Николая Кононихина. СПб., 2001. С.3.
Sergei V. Ivanov. Unknown Socialist Realism. The Leningrad School. Saint Petersburg, NP-Print Edition, 2007. PP.9, 15, 20, 21, 24, 370, 388, 390, 391, 399, 401, 403–406, 439, 442, 445. , .
Anniversary Directory graduates of Saint Petersburg State Academic Institute of Painting, Sculpture, and Architecture named after Ilya Repin, Russian Academy of Arts. 1915 - 2005. Saint Petersburg, Pervotsvet Publishing House, 2007. P.61.  .
Данилова А. Группа одиннадцати как художественное явление в изобразительном искусстве Ленинграда 1960—1980 годов // Общество. Среда. Развитие. Научно-теоретический журнал. No. 3, 2010. С.160-164.
Традиции школы живописи государственной художественно-промышленной академии имени А. Л. Штиглица. Кафедра общей живописи. — СПб., 2010. С.15, 271.
Иванов С. Тихая жизнь за ленинградским столом // Петербургские искусствоведческие тетради. Выпуск 23. СПб., 2012. С.90-97.
Логвинова Е. Круглый стол по ленинградскому искусству в галерее АРКА // Петербургские искусствоведческие тетради. Вып. 31. СПб, 2014. С.17-26.

External links
 Artist Victor Teterin (1922-1991). Painting. The Leningrad School (VIDEO)
 Exhibition of Victor Teterin in ARKA Fine Art Gallery

1922 births
1991 deaths
People from Rameshkovsky District
20th-century Russian painters
Russian male painters
Soviet painters
Socialist realist artists
Russian watercolorists
Leningrad School artists
Members of the Leningrad Union of Artists
Leningrad Secondary Art School alumni
Repin Institute of Arts alumni
Russian still life painters
20th-century Russian male artists